This Patch of Sky were an Oregon instrumental post rock band, formed in 2010 in Eugene. The band typically composed cinematic instrumental pieces that combine subtle-nuanced melodies and wall-of-sound guitars to create a symphonic landscape.  The band was signed to German indie label Oxide-Tones in 2011 and released "The Immortal, The Invisible" and "Newly Risen, How Brightly You Shine".  In 2013 Oxide-Tones became extinct, resulting in the band releasing full-length album "Heroes and Ghosts" independently.  In August 2014, the band released a full length self-titled album independently. In September 2017, the band signed with Graphic Nature Records, an imprint of Equal Vision Records and released a full length "These Small Spaces". In September 2019, they disbanded. 

On December 30, 2014 This Patch of Sky's studio album Heroes and Ghosts was chosen as AmpKicker's Top 20 albums of 2013.

In January 2014, This Patch of Sky was voted as "Most Improved Artist" in the annual Postrockstar 2013 Year End awards.

Band members
Current

Former
Andrew Sandahl – guitar (2010–2012)
Chris King - keyboards, synthesizer, rhodes (2012–2015)
Austin Zentz - guitar (2012–2013)
Nate Trowbridge – drums (2010–2016)
Joel Erickson – bass, synth, rhodes (2010–2019)
Kit Day – guitar (2010–2019)
Joshua Carlton – guitar (2012–2019)
Alex Abrams – cello (2014–2019)
Neal Williams - bass (2019–2019)
Katya Marcusky – drums (2016–2019)

Discography

Studio albums
 Heroes and Ghosts (2013)
 S/T (2014)
 These Small Spaces (Sept 22nd 2017)

Soundtracks
Brand:  A Second Coming (2015)

EPs
 The Immortal, The Invisible (2011)
 Newly Risen, How Brightly You Shine (2012)

Compilations
 Heroes and Ghosts appears on the "Ode To An Unspoken Moment" Compilation(2013)

In popular culture
Their song "With Morning Comes Hope" is featured in 
Their song "Newly Risen, How Brightly You Shine" is featured in the 2014 "
Their song "A Light In The Attic" is used for the trailer Cuando Toco - When Touched
Their song "A Light In The Attic" is used for 2012 
Their song "A Light In The Attic" is used for the "
Their song "Newly Risen, How Brightly You Shine" is used for a Petco commercial featuring the 
Their song "A Light In The Attic" is used in the

See also
List of post-rock bands
List of instrumental bands

References

External links

American post-rock groups
2010 establishments in Oregon
Musical groups from Eugene, Oregon
Musical groups established in 2010
Equal Vision Records artists